Suva Reka or Suhareka (also known as Suharekë and Therandë in Albanian)  is a town and municipality located in the Prizren district of central-southern Kosovo. According to the 2011 census, the town has 10,422 inhabitants, while the municipality has 59,722 inhabitants.

Name
Suva Reka means "dry river" in Serbian. The Albanian spellings are Suharekë or Suhareka (derived from the Slavic form), while an alternative name was recently created by the Albanological Institute, Therandë, adopted from an unlocated ancient site (possibly in Suhareka or Lubizhda in the Mirusha valley).

History

Historical background
The municipality includes several medieval Serbian sites and old settlements, such as the villages of Banja, Suva Reka, Dulje, Mušutište, Popovljane, Rečane, Suva Reka, and churches of Virgin Hodegetria, St. George, Holy Trinity, St. Nicholas, among others. The settlement of Suva Reka itself was first mentioned in 1348.

Yugoslav period
From 1929 to 1941, Suva Reka was a village part of the Vardar Banovina of the Kingdom of Yugoslavia.

Between 1918 and 1941 the demographic structure of the municipality of Suva Reka has been affected by settlements and colonization such as the Serbian colonization and population settlement, for the most part from the Toplica District.

On the night of 9–10 June 1984, ethnic Albanians desecrated 29 tombstones of the Church of the Holy Saviour.

Kosovo War and aftermath
During the Kosovo War (1998–99), the Yugoslav army operated in the region and it was reported that it had killed and wounded many Albanian civilians. According to the Suva Reka office of the Council for the Defense of Human Rights and Freedoms, 430 people were killed in the municipality and 67 people were missing as of late August 1999. 

The Suva Reka massacre conducted on 26 March 1999 committed by Serbian police officers resulted in 48 victims, fourteen of which were under 15 years old. 46 members of the victims were part of the Berisha family who were targeted because they had rented one of their homes to the OSCE observers in Suva Reka, who provided a sense of security to the local Albanians but withdrew from the area when NATO bombing began. After the slight withdrawal of the OSCE, incidences of abuse increased around late March, specifically with the beating and the harassment of ethnic Albanians residents by the Serbian police. Consequently, tensions soon increased after at least seven ethnic Albanians were killed by police or disappeared in unclear circumstances.

According to the OSCE, killings of smaller numbers of people also took place in the following villages: Bukos (Bukosh), Budakovo (Budakove), Vranic (Vraniq), Geljance (Gelanc), Sopina (Sopine), Mus-utiste (Mushtishte), and Lesane (Leshane).

After the war, Serbian heritage was destroyed all over Kosovo. The churches (including cemeteries) of Virgin Hodegetria, St. George, Holy Trinity, St. Nicholas and others were completely destroyed in 1999 after the arrival of KFOR and the end of the war.

NATO set up a military base in the municipality, Camp Casablanca.

Culture

Churches
 Church of the Virgin Hodegetria, Mušutište, built 1315, destroyed 1999
 Church of St. George, Rečane, built in the 14th century, destroyed 1999
 Church of the Holy Trinity, Mušutište, built before 1465, destroyed 1999
 Church of the Holy Saviour, Mušutište, built in 1465, destroyed 1999
 Church of St. Nicholas, Popovljane, built in 1626, destroyed 1999
 Church of Archangel Michael, Dvorane, built in the 19th century, destroyed 1999
 Church of the Holy Saviour, Dvorane, built in the 19th century, destroyed 1999
 Church of the Holy Apostles Peter and Paul, Suva Reka, built 1938, destroyed 1999
 Church of St. Parasčeva, Mušutište, built 1973, destroyed 1999

Mosques
 Suva Reka City Mosque
 Peqani Mosque
 Semetisht Mosque
 Gjinoc Mosque
 Sopine Mosque

Demographics

According to the 2011 census done by the Government of Kosovo, the municipality of Suva Reka had 59,722 inhabitants of which 98.9% were Kosovo Albanians. According to OSCE, the whereabouts of the displaced Serb and Roma communities is unknown.

Twin towns – Sister cities 
Suva Reka is twinned with:
  Sarandë, Albania
  Fellbach, Germany
  Lilburn, United States

Notes and references
Notes

References

External links 

 Municipality of Suva Reka
 OSCE municipal profile of Suva Reka
 SOK Kosovo and its population
 

 
Cities in Kosovo
Municipalities of Kosovo
Populated places in Prizren District